XHAGE-FM is a radio station on 102.3 FM in Acapulco, Guerrero, Mexico. It is owned by Grupo ACIR and carries its Mix format.

History
XHAGE received its concession on January 29, 1993. It was owned by Carlos Manuel Flores y Álvarez but promptly sold to ACIR.

References

Radio stations in Guerrero
Radio stations established in 1993
Grupo ACIR